Floris Jespers (18 March 1889 in Borgerhout – 16 April 1965 in Antwerp) was a Belgian Avant-garde painter.

After his graduation from the Antwerp Academy of Fine Arts, he hooked up with the poet Paul Van Ostaijen and joined the Antwerp avant-garde movement of the 1920s. 
He contributed to the publications Ça Ira, Le Centaure and Sélection and befriended Jean Metzinger and Albert Gleizes when they published Du Cubisme. In 1921 he had an exhibition abroad for the first time (the exhibition of the Dutch artistic group De Branding with Kurt Schwitters and Fokko Mees). In 1925 he became a member of Contemporary Art (Kunst van Heden). He is mentioned by name in Paul Van Ostaijen's poem 'Huldegedicht aan Singer'.

He travelled to Belgian Congo for the first time in 1951. He stayed in the city of Kamina where his son Mark worked as a doctor. The journey was a revelation for him. He translated his impressions of African women into colorful frescoes. The African paintings of Jespers are not genre scenes but they present a greater vision of Africa. From the mysterious gazes and the faces of the Swimmers painted in Ostend in 1927 and the Congolese women of the fifties the same idealised vision of the untouchable and enigmatic African woman emerges.

He also used the verre églomisé technique.

References

1889 births
1965 deaths
Royal Academy of Fine Arts (Antwerp) alumni
20th-century Belgian painters
People from Borgerhout